Gorytvesica cerussolinea is a species of moth of the family Tortricidae. It is endemic to Ecuador (Morona-Santiago Province).

The ground colour of the forewings is vivid brown, but paler terminally, where minute brown strigulae are present. The lines are snow white. The hindwings are cream, but more whitish grey in basal half, in distal part tinged with pale ochreous.

Etymology
The species name refers to the forewing lines and is derived from Latin cerussa (meaning white paint) and linea (meaning line).

References

External links

Moths described in 2006
Endemic fauna of Ecuador
Euliini
Moths of South America
Taxa named by Józef Razowski